Glen C. Jones (1910–1983) was born on July 15, 1910, in Overton, Nevada and moved to Las Vegas in 1929. He began his law enforcement career in 1935 with the Clark County Sheriff's Office. He worked his way through the ranks and eventually served as undersheriff to Sheriff Gene Ward. He was elected sheriff in 1942 and served for three terms before being defeated in 1954 by Butch Leypoldt. His defeat is discussed in Chapter VI of The Green Felt Jungle (1963) by Ed Reid and Ovid Demaris. Jones was the founder of the Sheriff's Posse and the Aero Squadron. He died in September 1983, at the age of 73.

References

1910 births
1983 deaths
Nevada sheriffs
20th-century American politicians